Vijayashanti (born 24 June 1966) is an Indian actress, producer and politician. In a film career spanning 40 years, she has acted in 187 feature films in a variety of roles in various languages predominantly in Telugu,  Tamil, in addition to Hindi, Kannada and Malayalam films. She won the National Film Award for Best Actress for her work as a "super cop" in Kartavyam (1990), for depicting both aggression and feminity with balance and restraint. For her role in Pratighatana (1985), Vijayashanti won her first state Nandi Award and Filmfare Award. She is a recipient of several accolades, including four Andhra Pradesh state Nandi Awards for Best Actress, seven Filmfare Awards South together with a Lifetime Achievement Award in 2003, and the Kalaimamani Award from Tamil Nadu Government. 

Referred to as the "Lady Superstar", "Lady Amitabh", and "The Action Queen of Indian Cinema", Vijayashanti appeared in successful films like Neti Bharatam (1983), Agni Parvatam (1984),  Challenge (1984), Pratighatana (1985), Repati Pourulu (1986),  Pasivadi Pranam (1987), Muvva Gopaludu (1987), Yamudiki Mogudu (1988), Athaku Yamudu Ammayiki Mogudu (1989), Janaki Ramudu (1988), Muddula Mavayya (1989), Kondaveeti Donga (1990), Indrudu Chandrudu (1989), Lorry Driver (1990), Sathruvu (1990), Gang Leader (1991), Mannan (1992), Rowdy Inspector (1992), Mondi Mogudu Penki Pellam (1992), Chinarayudu (1993) and Police Lockup (1993), establishing herself as one of the leading actresses of Telugu cinema and being cited in the media as one of the nation's most popular and attractive personalities of the late 80s and 90s. In 1987, she appeared in Swayam Krushi alongside Chiranjeevi, which was screened at the Moscow International Film Festival, and Padamati Sandhya Ragam with Hollywood actor Thomas Jane, which was screened at the Louisville International Film Festival.

She entered state politics in 1998. She served as the Member of Parliament in the 15th Lok Sabha, representing the Medak constituency from Telangana Rashtra Samithi. , she is a member of the Bharatiya Janata Party.

Early life
Vijayashanti was born on 24 June 1966 to Satti Srinivas Prasad (Anaparthi, East Godavari District) and Varalakshmi (Eturunagaram, Mulugu District), Madras, Tamil Nadu. She is the niece of famous Telugu actress and producer Vijayalalitha. She has said that she prefers to think of herself as being from Telangana rather than Madras, although as of 2004 she had never visited her ancestral village of Ramannagudem near Eturnagaram.

She completed her 10th class at Holy Angels Anglo Indian Higher Secondary School, Chennai, before starting her film career.

Film career (1980-present)

Early career 
Vijayashanti began her acting career at the age of 14 in 1980, playing a character role in the Tamil film Kallukkul Eeram, directed by P S Nivas starring Bharathiraja. In the same year, she debuted in Telugu cinema with the movie Kilaadi Krishnudu, opposite Krishna, directed by Vijaya Nirmala. She got a role in the Telugu film Satyam-Sivam (1981), the cast of which included N. T. Rama Rao and Akkineni Nageswara Rao.

Balance of Glamour and Women-centric roles (1983-1993) 
Initially she played many character role like sister, daughter and then after a couple of inconsequential movies came Pellichoopulu (1983), which brought recognition to her as a star. This was a remake of K. Bhagyaraj's Tamil film Thooral Ninnu Pochchu. Her breakthrough movie was Neti Bharatam (1983), and from there she started acting in women-centric roles, teaming up with T. Krishna. He spotted her on the sets of his friend Madala Rangarao's Navodayam. He saw her perform and predicted that she would turn out to be a good actress. In 1985, Pratighatana, one of the biggest blockbusters of the year, won her accolades and a state Nandi Award for the first time. She delivered a powerful performance in the song "Ee Dhuryodhana Dusshasana", penned by legendary lyricist Veturi and powerfully sung by S. Janaki.

In 1992 Mondi Mogudu Penki Pellam was a huge success. Vijayashanti played a bold lady speaking Telangana slang and delivered the career-defining song "Laloo Darwaja Laskar". In 1994 it was remade into Hindi as Meri Biwi Ka Jawab Nahin. In the 1990s, Vijayashanti was the only actress demanding highest remuneration in India, equal to her co-stars Rajnikanth and Chiranjeevi. Most of her films with Chiranjeevi (19 films) and Balakrishna (17 films) were huge hits and her on-screen chemistry was huge success on par with the box office. In K. Viswanath's Swayam Krushi, where she acts as an illiterate woman who falls in love with a cobbler played by Chiranjeevi. Her dialogue in Atta Soodamakayya is highly applauded along with her performance in Swayam Krushi. She starred in Sathruvu, Surya IPS and Chinarayudu, along with Daggubati Venkatesh. She starred with Akkineni Nagarjuna in Vijay, and Janaki Ramudu in Jaitra Yatra. She starred alongside Rajinikanth as the antagonist in the film Mannan, and with Kamal Haasan as an investigative reporter in Indrudu Chandrudu. She acted in two movies with Malayalam superstar Suresh Gopi, Yuvathurki and Kallu Kondoru Pennu. She produced the film Nippu Ravva (1993), starring Balakrishna, under the banner Yuvarathna Arts.

Hindi cinema (1989-1997) 
In 1989, she was introduced to Hindi cinema by K. Viswanath alongside Anil Kapoor in the film Eeshwar, a remake of his Telugu film Swathi Muthyam. Her second Hindi film was Muqaddar Ka Badshaah, a remake of the Telugu film Aswaddama. In the Hindi version, she acted with another National Award-winning actress - Shabana Azmi. Her other starrers are Apradhi, in which she is co-starring with Anil Kapoor and Tejaswini, a remake of Karthavyam, directed by N. Chandra. Another Bollywood movie of hers is Gundagardi (1997), starring Dharmendra in an action role. In 1996, she was paired opposite Amitabh Bachchan in Zamaanat, directed by S. Ramanathan, but the film was shelved.

National Award and Woman-oriented roles (1990-2006) 
In a carefully nurtured career, Vijayashanthi reached the status of a "HERO" at box office parlance. In the blockbuster movie Karthavyam (1990), her performance as a tough cop (modelled after the real-life supercop Kiran Bedi) under the direction of Mohan Gandhi won her the National Film Award from the Government of India and an Andhra Pradesh State award for best actress. Actor Ravi Teja was introduced in the film as a side artist. The film was made with a budget of about 90 lakhs and grossed over 7 crores in southern territories alone. The film was screened at the 14th International Film Festival of India in the mainstream section. She was the third woman from Telugu cinema to win the award after Sharada and Archana.

The success of this movie saw her moving away from glamorous roles and limiting herself to woman-oriented roles. "There were people who questioned how can a Heroine attain the image of Hero & charge highest remuneration. But, I had overcome all of the hurdles and answered the critics with successful films," she answered.

Vijayashanti didn't rely on stunt doubles for performing risky stunts in many films. There were times when the she jumped for a height of 30 feet and she hardly cared about the injuries.

In 1990, Karthavyam was dubbed into Tamil as Vyjayanthi IPS and its success brought her fame in Tamil cinema. (It was also remade in Hindi as Tejaswini, with herself playing the lead role. This, too, did very well at the Hindi box office.) The film inspired the then 10-year old C. Indhumathi to take up the civil services exam; she cleared the UPSC exam and bagged 151st rank and placed in Madurai. Vyjayanthi IPS ran for 50 days in Vetri theater in Chennai. This record was broken by a dubbed version of Baahubali in August 2015.

A. M. Ratnam, Vijayashanti's personal make-up man, turned out to be a money-making producer. As an executive producer for Vijayashanti, he  made the award-winning Karthavyam on the banner of Sri Surya Movies. On the same banner, she produced and acted in Aashayam released in 1993, which had a decent run. In Police Lockup she played a dual role, directed by Kodi Ramakrishna, for which she won another Filmfare Award for Best Actress. Later she played action roles. In Osey Ramulamma (1997), she played a downtrodden woman who rose against her oppressors. Directed by Dasari Narayana Rao, this was the biggest blockbuster of the year, giving Vijayashanti her fourth Nandi Award and sixth Filmfare Award for Best Actress. This film gave her another name, called as "Ramulamma/Ramulakka" by the people. The music of this film, composed by Vandemataram Srinivas, also won the Nandi Award.

Later, she appeared in critically acclaimed women oriented movies like Adavi Chukka and Rowdy Durbar,  directed by Dasari Narayana Rao.

Vijayashanthi has also worked for many commercials like Chandana Bros., and Power Detergent soap. She was the first actress to be first featured in a Saree commercial.

Comeback into films (2019-present) 
Vijayashanti returned to cinema after a sabbatical of 13 years, starring in the 2020 film Sarileru Neekevvaru where Mahesh Babu played the main protagonist.

Her last seen movie is Nayudamma, released in 2006. Anil Ravipudi shared a welcome picture on Twitter on 12 August 2019 announcing her return to films with a makeup mirror placed in front of her. He wrote "After 13 years.. It's make up time for Vijayashanthi garu.. Nothing has ever changed in all these 13 years. Same discipline, same attitude and same dynamism. Welcome on-board". She was paid 4 crores for her re-entry film Sarileru Neekevvaru.

Political career (1998-present) 
In 1998, Vijayashanti joined the Bharatiya Janata Party and was soon made the secretary of BJP's Women's Wing (Bharateeya Mahila Morcha). In 1998, her first public meeting was held at Nellore, a big hit in support of BJP. During the 1999 general election she was named BJP's contestant from the Cuddapah Lok Sabha seat against Sonia Gandhi of Congress(I). However, she withdrew from the race after Sonia Gandhi decided to contest from Bellary. In 1996, Vijayashanti, who is pro-BJP, vowed her support to the All India Anna Dravida Munnetra Kazhagam (AIADMK), and was a star campaigner for then Chief Jayalalitha. Vijayashanti is the star campaigner for BJP Lok Sabha Polls in Tamil Nadu along with Cricketer Srikkanth.

She started her own political party, Talli Telangana, in January 2009, which she merged into Telangana Rashtra Samithi (TRS) due to lack of strength and support. From 1999, her movie appearances decreased as she focused on her political career. By 2004, she had stopped signing up for new films. In the 2009 general election, she won as a Member of Parliament from the Medak constituency from TRS. In June 2009, she resigned from the post of secretary general of TRS, expressing solidarity with the resignation of Kalvakuntla Chandrashekar Rao.

In 2011, she submitted her resignation as an MP along with Kalvakuntla Chandrashekar Rao in agitation of Telangana movement. The resignation was later rejected by the speaker of the house, as it was not in the proper format. Later, she actively participated in politics for separate Telangana State (region), in which she played a key role.

Vijayashanti joined the Indian National Congress party in February 2014 after a split with TRS chief KCR. She contested in the assembly elections from Medak in the 2014 general elections from Indian National Congress party and lost as MLA. After some inactive years, in 2018 AICC president Rahul Gandhi appointed Vijayashanti as star campaigner and adviser to the election campaign committee of Telangana PCC.

Vijayashanti in March 2019, started a controversy after she compared Narendra Modi to a terrorist and claimed he was “ruling like a dictator”. She made these statements at a rally in Telangana's Shamshabad village in Ranga Reddy district. Vijayashanti said, “He is appearing like a terrorist. Instead of loving his people, he is scaring them. And said this is not a characteristic of a prime minister.

She resigned from the Congress in November 2020 and rejoined the Bharatiya Janata Party on 6 December 2020 in the presence of Home Minister Amit Shah.

Personal life
Vijayashanti is married to M. V. Srinivas Prasad in 1988. He does real estate business around Chennai and Hyderabad. He is a nephew to Daggubati Purandareswari.

Awards and honours

Filmography

References

External links
 
 
 

1966 births
Living people
Bharatiya Janata Party politicians from Telangana
Indian National Congress politicians from Telangana
Telangana Rashtra Samithi politicians
Actresses from Telangana
Women in Telangana politics
Actresses in Kannada cinema
Best Actress National Film Award winners
Indian actor-politicians
India MPs 2009–2014
Actresses in Malayalam cinema
Actresses in Tamil cinema
Filmfare Awards South winners
Actresses in Hindi cinema
Nandi Award winners
Lok Sabha members from Andhra Pradesh
20th-century Indian actresses
People from Medak district
Actresses in Telugu cinema
Women members of the Lok Sabha
21st-century Indian women politicians